Cora subdavicrinita is a species of basidiolichen in the family Hygrophoraceae. Found in South America, it was formally described as a new species in 2016 by Bibiana Moncada, Jorge Alberto Molina, and Robert Lücking. The specific epithet subdavicrinita refers to its resemblance to Cora davicrinita. Here it grows as an epiphyte on shrubs with bryophytes and other lichens. Its morphologically similar namesake, C. crinita, is not closely related, occurring in a different clade in genus Cora.

References

subdavicrinita
Lichen species
Lichens described in 2016
Lichens of Colombia
Lichens of Ecuador
Taxa named by Robert Lücking
Basidiolichens